This article is an incomplete list of the bird species found in the Sawtooth National Recreation Area in central Idaho.  This list is not an official list, but primarily consists of species that are likely to breed or winter in the Sawtooth National Recreation Area and may exclude vagrants and migrants that may pass through during migration.

Greese, swans, and ducks
Canada goose
Wood duck
American wigeon
Gadwall
Mallard
Northern pintail
Blue-winged teal
Cinnamon teal
Northern shoveler
Green-winged teal
Canvasback
Redhead
Ring-necked duck
Lesser scaup
Common goldeneye
Bufflehead
Ruddy duck
Common merganser
Hooded merganser

Gallinaceous birds
Wild turkey
Greater sage grouse
Ruffed grouse
Spruce grouse
Dusky grouse
Ring-necked pheasant (not native)
Grey partridge
Chukar

Grebes
Pied-billed grebe
Eared grebe
Western grebe
Western grebe
Clark's grebe

Pelicans
American white pelican

Cormorants
Double-crested cormorant

Bitterns, herons, and allies
Great blue heron
Black-crowned night heron
American bittern

Cranes
Sandhill crane

New World vultures
Turkey vulture

Hawks, kites, eagles, and allies
Bald eagle
Golden eagle
Osprey
Sharp-shinned hawk
Cooper's hawk
Northern goshawk
Northern harrier
Rough-legged hawk
Red-tailed hawk
Swainson's hawk
Ferruginous hawk

Caracaras and falcons
Prairie falcon
Peregrine falcon
American kestrel
Merlin (bird)

Coots, gallinules, and rails
American coot
Virginia rail
Sora

Plovers
Killdeer

Sandpipers, phalaropes, and allies
Willet
Spotted sandpiper
Wilson's snipe

Gulls
Ring-billed gull

Pigeons and doves
Rock pigeon (not native)
Mourning dove

Owls
Long-eared owl
Great horned owl
Barred owl
Great grey owl
Snowy owl
Western screech owl
Flammulated owl
Northern saw-whet owl
Boreal owl
Mountain pygmy owl

Goatsuckers (nightjars)
Common nighthawk

Hummingbirds
Broad-tailed hummingbird
Rufous hummingbird
Calliope hummingbird

Swifts
White-throated swift

Kingfishers
Belted kingfisher

Woodpeckers and allies
Lewis's woodpecker
Northern flicker
Williamson's sapsucker
Red-naped sapsucker
Hairy woodpecker
Downy woodpecker
American three-toed woodpecker
Black-backed woodpecker
Pileated woodpecker

Tyrant flycatchers
Olive-sided flycatcher
Western wood pewee
Willow flycatcher
Cordilleran flycatcher
Hammond's flycatcher
American dusky flycatcher

Miscellaneous flycatchers
Say's phoebe
Western kingbird
Eastern kingbird

Shrikes
Northern shrike
Loggerhead shrike

Vireos
Warbling vireo

Jays, crows, and allies
Steller's jay
Clark's nutcracker
Canada jay
Common raven
Black-billed magpie
American crow

Swallows
Tree swallow
Bank swallow
Northern rough-winged swallow
Violet-green swallow
Cliff swallow
Barn swallow

Larks
Horned lark

Chickadees and titmice
Black-capped chickadee
Mountain chickadee

Nuthatches
White-breasted nuthatch
Red-breasted nuthatch

Creepers
Brown creeper

Wrens
House wren
Winter wren
Marsh wren
Canyon wren
Rock wren

Dippers
American dipper

Kinglets
Ruby-crowned kinglet
Golden-crowned kinglet

Thrushes
Western bluebird
Mountain bluebird
Townsend's solitaire
Veery
Swainson's thrush
Hermit thrush
American robin

Mockingbirds and thrashers
Sage thrasher
Gray catbird

Waxwings
Bohemian waxwing
Cedar waxwing

Starlings
European starling (not native)

Wood-warblers
Orange-crowned warbler
Yellow warbler
Yellow-rumped warbler
American redstart
MacGillivray's warbler
Common yellowthroat
Wilson's warbler
Yellow-breasted chat

Tanagers
Western tanager

Emberizids
Spotted towhee
Lark sparrow
American tree sparrow
Chipping sparrow
Brewer's sparrow
Savannah sparrow
Fox sparrow
Song sparrow
Lincoln's sparrow
Vesper sparrow
White-crowned sparrow
Dark-eyed junco
Lapland longspur
Snow bunting

Cardinals, buntings, and allies
Black headed grosbeak
Lazuli bunting

Blackbirds and orioles
Western meadowlark
Red-winged blackbird
Yellow-headed blackbird
Bobolink
Brewer's blackbird
Brown-headed cowbird
Bullock's oriole

Finches and allies
Black rosy finch
Gray-crowned rosy finch
Red crossbill
House finch
Cassin's finch
Pine grosbeak
Evening grosbeak
American goldfinch
Pine siskin

Old World sparrows
House sparrow (not native)

See also

List of animals of the Sawtooth National Recreation Area
Sawtooth National Forest
Sawtooth National Recreation Area

References

External links
 U.S. Forest Service - Sawtooth National Recreation Area

Sawtooth National Forest